Middle Brother may refer to:

Places
 Middle Brother (Chagos Bank), an island in the British Indian Ocean Territory
 Middle Brother Islet, Queensland, Australia
 Middle Brother National Park, New South Wales, Australia
 Middle Brother, Three Brothers (New South Wales), Australia, a mountain

Other uses
 Middle Brother (band), American rock band
 Middle Brother (album), 2011